Jhon Lorens Marchán Cordero (born 2 September 1998) is a Venezuelan footballer who plays as a winger for Universidad Técnica de Cajamarca on loan from Sporting Cristal.

Career statistics

Club

Notes

References

1998 births
Living people
Venezuelan footballers
Venezuelan expatriate footballers
Association football wingers
People from Acarigua
Portuguesa F.C. players
Sporting Cristal footballers
Universidad Técnica de Cajamarca footballers
Venezuelan Primera División players
Peruvian Primera División players
Venezuelan expatriate sportspeople in Peru
Expatriate footballers in Peru